"Loliwe" is a song by South African singer-songwriter Zahara. It was officially released on August 31, 2011, serving as the lead single from her debut studio album of the same name.

Background and recording
In an interview with NTV Kenya, Zahara described "Loliwe" as a song written to inspire one to achieve their destiny through patience and perseverance. Zahara said the song is primarily about the train that transported her fathers and forefathers from Johannesburg to East London during the Apartheid era. Furthermore, she said many people had hope that the train will bring their loved ones back. "Loliwe" was composed with a five-string guitar.

Music video
The music video for "Loliwe" was produced by Mastermax Films.

Accolades
"Loliwe" earned Zahara the awards for Female Artist of the Year and Newcomer of the Year at the 18th South African Music Awards. The song won Best Selling Full-Track Download of the Year at the aforementioned awards ceremony, as well as Song of the Year at the 2011 Metro FM Music Awards. It enabled Zahara to win Best Female Artist from Southern Africa at the 2012 Kora Awards, as well as received a nomination for African Artist Of The Year at The Headies 2012. Moreover, the song won Best Selling Ring-Back-Tone at the 19th Annual South African Music Awards.  The music video for "Loliwe" won Best Female Video at the 2012 Channel O Music Video Awards.

Track listing
 Digital single

Video release history

References

2011 songs
2011 singles
Zahara (South African musician) songs